The Malta Youth Football Association (commonly referred to as the 'Youth FA') oversees youth football in the country of Malta. It started with the founding of the Educational Sports Centre in Marsa in 1972. That was the first nursery in Malta. Hundreds of children attended once or twice a week to train in football, basketball, athletics and gymnastics. Slowly, the early eighties gave birth to the football nursery practically in every town in Malta. The Youth F.A. was officially established in 1982 comprising first 8 nurseries and clubs progressing rapidly to the present day. Each nursery caters for children from 6 years to 17-year-old youths In the categories of Under 7, Under 9, Under 11, Under 13, Under 15 and Under 17. Nearly each nursery participates in Under 10 & 12 Festivals as well as in U/14 & U/16 Competitions (Under 19 teams do not form part of the Youth F.A. but of the Malta F.A.). The aims of the educational sports center, as the name denotes, was to educate children through sports. Although the Youth F.A. and all the nurseries do not refer directly to education in their names, the spirit of the aims remain those of forming the characters of children and youths through the game of football.

Member clubs

Youth
Youth football in Malta